The High Sheriff of Armagh is the Sovereign's judicial representative in County Armagh. Initially an office for lifetime, assigned by the Sovereign, the High Sheriff became annually appointed from the Provisions of Oxford in 1258. Besides his/her judicial importance, they have ceremonial and administrative functions and executes High Court Writs.

History
The first (High) Shrivalties were established before the Norman Conquest in 1066 and date back to Saxon times. In 1908, an Order in Council made the Lord-Lieutenant the Sovereign's prime representative in a county and reduced the High Sheriff's precedence. However the office still retained the responsibility for the preservation of law and order in a county.

While the office of High Sheriff ceased to exist in those Irish counties, which had formed the Irish Free State in 1922, it is still present in the counties of Northern Ireland.

James I, 1603–1625

1603: Sir Marmaduke Whitchurch
1613: Charles Poyntz
1618:
1622:
1623: Sir William Brownlow

Charles I, 1625–1649

1625:
1626:
1627:
1628:
1629:
1630:
1631:
1632:
1633:
1634:
1635:
1636:

English Interregnum, 1649–1660

1655: Sir George Acheson, 3rd Bt
1656: Sir George Acheson, 3rd Bt
1659:

Charles II, 1660–1685

1660:
1661:
1662:
1663:
1664:
1665: Edward Richardson of Legacorry
1666:
1667:
1668: Arthur Brownlow
1669: Arthur Brownlow
1670:
1671:
1672:

1673:
1674:
1675:
1676:
1677:
1678: Godfrey Walker
1679:
1680:
1681:
1682:
1683:
1684: George Blacker

James II, 1685–1688

1685:
1686: Marcus Clerk

1687:
1688: Hamlett Obins

William III, 1689–1702

1689:
1690: William Richardson of Legacorry
1691:
1692:
1693:
1694:
1695: Sir Nicholas Acheson, 4th Bt

1696:
1697: Arthur Brownlow
1698:
1699:
1700:
1701:

Anne, 1702–1714

1702: Roger Hall
1703:
1704:
1705:
1706:
1707:

1708:
1709:
1710:
1711:
1712:
1713:

George I, 1714–1727

1714: Edward Bond
1715: John Richardson
1716: James Maison
1717: Oliver St John
1718: John Maxwell
1719: John Bolton
1720: Henry Richardson

1721: Sir William Johnston
1722: Joshua Johnston
1723: Thomas Tipping
1724: Thomas Clarke
1725: Anthony Madden
1726: Francis Obre

George II, 1727–1760

1727: William Jones
1728: Sir Arthur Acheson, 5th Bt
1729: Meredith Workman
1730: John Ball
1731: Thomas D. Clarke
1732: Chapel Dawson
1733: Richard Johnston
1734: William Blacker of Carrickblacker and Brookend
1735: Randal Donaldson
1736: Robert Cope
1737: William Richardson of Richhill Castle
1738: William Graham
1739: Roger Hall of Mount Hall
1740: Francis Hall
1741: Edward Obre
1742: Richard Chapel Whaley
1743: Richard Graham
 
1744: Sir Capel Molyneux, 3rd Bt
1745: Henry Bond
1746: Thomas Tipping
1747: Middleton Bond
1748: Jonathan Seaver
1749: Thomas Bond
1750: William Brownlow
1751: Sir Archibald Acheson, 6th Bt
1752: Alexander Stewart
1753: Meredith Workman
1754: Thomas T. Dawson
1755: Huntly Hutcheson
1756: Hon. William Moore
1757: John Bond
1758: Richard Johnston
1759: Arthur Irwin

George III, 1760–1820

1760: Richard Jackson
1761: Daniel Kelly
1762: Richard Magenis
1763: Thomas Rowe
1764: Michael Obins of Castle Obins
1765: Thomas Clarke
1766: Arthur Cope
1767: John Moore
1768: Thomas Obre
1769: Henry Cust
1770: Thomas Dawson
1771: Richard Johnston
1772: Thomas Clarke
1773: Edward Tipping
1774: Arthur Graham
1775: Thomas Seaver of Heath Hall (son of Jonathan, HS 1748)
1776: Samuel MacGeough of Derrycaw
1777: William Richardson of Richhill Castle
1778: Arthur Noble
1779: Thomas M. Jones
1780: Maxwell Close of Elm Park
1781: James Alexander, 1st Earl of Caledon
1782: Henry Harden
1783: Sir Walter Synnot of Ballymoyer House
1784: Thomas Verner
1785: John Maxwell
1786: John Reilly
1787: William Brownlow
1788: Alexander Thomas Stewart
1789: James Verner

1790: James Johnston
1791: Nicholas Archdall Cope
1792: James Harden
1793: John Pringle
1794: John Ogle
1795: Savage Hall of Narrow Water
1796: John Ogle
1797: Robert Bernard Sparrow
1798: Kenrick Cope
1799: Robert Camden Cope ‡ / succeeded by Archibald Eyre Obins
1800: Thomas Verner
1801: Du Pre Alexander, Viscount Alexander
1802: John Henry Burges
1803: John Moore
1804: John O'Donnell
1805: Sir Capel Molyneux, 4th Bt
1806: George Ensor
1807: Jonathan Seaver of Heath Hall (son of Thomas, HS 1775)
1808: John Reade
1809: Robert Harden
1810: Hon. Jerome de Salis
1811: William Blacker
1812: Nicholas George Johnston
1813: Charles Eastwood
1814: Robert Macan
1815: Roger Hall
1816: Joseph Atkinson
1817: William Irwin of Mount Irwin
1818: Maxwell Close of Drumbanagher
1819: Walter MacGeough-Bond of Drumsill, Siver Bridge

George IV, 1820–1830

1820: Thomas J. Thornton
1821: Samuel Cope
1822: William Verner
1823: Sir James Strong
1824: James Johnston

1825: Thomas Atkinson
1826: Acheson St George
1827: William Olpherts
1828: Barry Fox
1829: Hunt Walsh Chambre of Hawthorn Hill

William IV, 1830–1837

1830: Marcus Synnot of Ballymoyer House
1831: Hugh Harris
1832: Hon. Henry Caulfeild
1833: James Eastwood

1834: Charles Brownlow
1835: Sir Edmund Bacon, 10th Baronet
1836: James Alexander, Viscount Alexander

Victoria, 1837–1901

1837: Sir George King Adlercron Molyneux, 6th Bt
1838: Leonard Dobbin
1839: Thomas Wilson
1840: William Jones Armstrong
1841: John Whaley
1842: James Molyneux Caulfeild
1843: Sir James Matthew Stronge, 3rd Baronet
1844: John Robert Irwin
1845: Thomas Morris Hamilton Jones of Moneyglass House
1846: Robert Wright Cope
1847: Maxwell Cross of Dartan
1848: William Verner
1849: Richard Blackson Houston
1850: James Harden
1851: George Robinson
1852: Marcus Synnot of Ballymoyer House
1853: Hon. Peter John Fane de Salis
1854: Maxwell Charles Close of Drumbanagher House
1855: Joseph Atkinson of Crowhill
1856: Henry Alexander of Forkhill House
1857: George Dunbar
1858: Stewart Blacker
1859: Edward James Saunderson
1860: William Cross of Dartan
1861: St John Thomas Blacker-Douglass of Grace Hall
1862: John James Bigger
1863: William Kirk
1864: Sir Capel Molyneux, 7th Baronet of Castle Dillon
1865: Hugh Harris of Ashfort
1866: H. W. Canefeild
1867: Sir Capel Molyneux, 7th Bt
1868: John Alexander Mainley Cope of Drumilly

1869: Samuel Madden Francis Hall of Narrow water
1870: John William Ellison-Macartney of Mountjoy Grange
1871: Richard James Harden of Harrybrook
1872: Joshua Walter MacGeough Bond of Drumsill
1873:
1874:
1875: Henry Bruce Armstrong
1876: Mark Seton Synnot of Ballymoyer House
1877: Thomas Simpson
1878: Patrick George Hamilton Carvill
1879: James Henry Todd-Thornton of Westbrook, Co. Donegal
1880: William James Hall of Narrow Water
1881:
1882:
1883: Granville Henry Jackson Alexander
1884: George Miller Dobbin of Drumulla House, Co. Louth
1885: Sir James Henry Stronge, 5th Bt
1886: William Arthur Irwin of Carnagh
1887: George de la Poer Beresford of Awbawn
1888: John Mervyn Archdall Carleton Richardson
1889:
1890: Henry Barcroft of the Glen
1891: James Rolston Lonsdale
1892: William Maynard Sinton
1893:
1894:
1895: John Brownlee Lonsdale
1896: Harry Felix Verner
1897:
1898: James Barrington-White
1899:
1900: Roger Hall of Narrow Water

Edward VII, 1901–1910

1901: Joseph Henry Gray
1902:
1903: William John Talbot
1904:
1905: Sir John Milne Barbour

1906: Joseph Mansergh Palmer
1907:
1908: Maxwell Archibald Close of Drumbanagher House
1909: William McCrum
1910:

George V, 1910–1936

1911:
1912:
1913:
1914: Hunt Walsh Leech
1915:
1916: William Byers
1917:
1918:
1919:
1920:
1921:
1922: Thomas Bowen Johnston
1923: Thomas Trew Maclean

1924: James Edward Calvert
1925: Thomas Henry White
1926: John Charters Boyle
1927: Samuel Alexander Bell
1928: William M. Clow
1929: Charles Barclay Macpherson Chambré
1930: Thomas Grevilie Sinton
1931: Noel Stephen Smith
1932: Gilbert Evelyn Barcroft
1933: David Malcomson Barcroft
1934: Arthur Dawson Allen
1935: Hector Charles Chatterton Deane
1936: Richard Henry Stephens Richardson

George VI, 1936–1952

1937: Arthur Delacherois Irwin
1938: William Edward Greeves
1939: George Valentine Crossley Irwin
1940: James Edwards Harden
1941: George Scott
1942: Thomas Averell Shillington
1943: Alfred William Cowdy
1944: Bunbury Archer Atkinson

1945: John Stephen Wakefield Richardson
1946: George Norman Proctor
1947: Robert McKean Cowdy
1948: Archibald Dunlap Gibson
1949: Alexander Reginald Wakefield Richardson
1950: George Fitzroy Gillespie
1951: Ynyr Alfred Burges

Elizabeth II, 1952–present

1952: Walter Albert Nevill MacGeough-Bond
1953: Cecil Brown
1954: William Alexander Mullen
1955: Harold Brown
1956: James Nicholson Brown
1957: Edward Kennedy Walkington
1958: Alleyn Cardwell Moore
1959: Richard Graves Johnston
1960: James Robert Bargrave Armstrong
1961: Henry Alwyn White
1962: Francis Edward Nangle
1963: Acheson Harden Glendinning
1964: George Edwin McCaw
1965: Michael Henry Armstrong
1966: George Dougan
1967: James Matthew Stronge
1968: Thomas Carter Johnston
1969: Alexander Edmond Knight
1970: John Fitzroy Gillespie
1971: Geoffrey Alastair Nisbet Boyne
1972: Kenneth McCleery
1973: W. Bernard Cowdy
1974: Henry William Francis Reid
1975: Henry George Glendinning
1976: Alexander Hugh O'Brien Greer
1977: Donald Henry Stevenson
1978: Ronald McIlroy Wilson
1979: Frederick Michael Alexander Torrens-Spence
1980: John Reginald Miller
1981: Alexander Hugh Courtney
1982: Andrew Alwyn White
1983: J. H. H. Balmer
1984: W. H. Jordan
1985: E. B. Wilson
1986:

1987:
1988:
1989:
1990:
1991: John Daniel Thompson
1992: James Rochester Nelson
1993: J. N. Greenlee
1994: J. E. Lamb
1995: John C. K. Magowan
1996: Margaret Patton
1997: John Oliver Woods
1998: David Eric Dorman
1999: Anne E. Cullen
2000: Archibald Thomas Laughlan Gibson
2001: Patrick Stephen Kellett
2002: Mary Catherine Dixon
2003: Barbara Ann Gillespie
2004: Caroline Bridget Good
2005: Leslie Victor Johnston of Armagh
2006: Ralph Edward Cope Cowdy of Loughgall
2007: Colin Wallace Mathews
2008: Desmond Robert David Mitchell
2009: Gerard Patrick Millar
2010: John Niall Collen
2011: Dr Peter W.B. Colvin of Hockley
2012: Dr Edmund Peter Beckett of Armagh
2013: James Magowan of Loughgilly
2014: Paul Reaney of Armagh
2015: Mrs Anna Louise Shepherd of Tandragee
2016: James Arthur Crummie of Portadown
2017: Godfrey William McCartney of Killylea
2018: Catherine Mary Adams of Craigavon
2019: Ian James Chapman of Craigavon
2020: Michael Frederick Dickson of Armagh
2021: Dr Alan Manson Turtlem, MBE of Richhill
2022: Henry Gabriel McMullen of Armagh

Charles III, 2022–present

Notes
‡ Stood as Member of Parliament

References

 
Armagh
History of County Armagh
Local government in Northern Ireland